IndieGala, s.r.l. is an Italy-based digital storefront for video games, which grew out of its original offering of Indie Gala Bundles, a collections of games sold at a price determined by the purchaser and with a portion of the price going towards charity and the rest split between the game developers. IndieGala continues to offer these limited-time bundles, but have expanded to include a greater and more persistent storefront.

History 
Initial bundles were typically collections of independently developed games featuring multi-platform support (including Microsoft Windows, macOS, and Linux platforms), mainly on the Steam platform. Subsequently, the bundles became more frequent and expanded to include games from established developers, AAA publishers, games for Android-based devices, games without digital rights management (DRM), graphic design assets. IndieGala's bundles were some of the first to feature digital copies of music and comic books. Bundles are presently offered on a more regular basis, with a persistent storefront for individual game sales.

The IndieGala Bundle offerings support a number of charities, including Save The Children, Child's Play, AbleGamers Foundation, Italian Red Cross charities, most notably supporting the efforts in the Emilia Romagna region of Italy that was affected by a series of earthquakes. The success of the Humble Bundle approach is what inspired IndieGala and a number of similar efforts to offer "pay what you want" bundles, including Indie Royale and Fanatical (formerly Bundle Stars).

The IndieGala operation has since grown to include a dedicated storefront, a Steam-like client similar to GOG's Galaxy or Desura's client, a publishing and development arm, as well as a fund to support indie games and indie developers.

As a corporation, IndieGala is headquartered in Rome, Italy, with about 25 employees. Its co-founder and CEO is Riccardo Rosapepe.

IndieGala's online debut and their first bundle named "The Indie Gala" was released on December 5, 2011, and sold over 20,000 copies.

IndieGala's first published game was officially released on Steam on May 21, 2015, and it sold over 40,000 copies globally.

IndieGala's first developed game was released in Early Access on Steam on the 20th of December 2017.

In March 2022 IndieGala announced the development of a new open-world horror game.

Developed Games

Published Games

Controversy and Criticism 
In 2013, a Indie Gala bundle had a part of its proceeds going towards the political election campaign of a candidate in Vancouver.

In 2017, in an attempt to mitigate piracy, IndieGala gave away one of their Unreal Engine titles, Die Young, which at that point of time was still in Early Access.

In 2017, due to a checkout issue involving G2A in the IndieGala system, customers were unknowingly subscribed to subscription trial. The company apologized and the affected customers were compensated.

In 2017, the customers of IndieGala together with other retailers such as Green Man Gaming and GamesPlanet who have purchased Castle of Illusion from their respective storefronts were affected by a series of key deactivations. The issue apparently stemmed from a technical mishap the moment when the publishing agreement between SEGA and Disney came to an end, the situation however was later resolved.

See also 

 Pay what you want
 Humble Bundle
 Indie Royale
 itch.io
 Desura
 Steam

References

External links 

 Official IndieGala website

Software distribution platforms
Online-only retailers of video games
Italian companies established in 2011
Companies based in Rome
Pay what you want game vendors